Curt Meyer (19 November 1919 – 18 April 2011) was a German mathematician. He made notable contributions to number theory.

A native of Bremerhaven, Meyer obtained his doctorate from the Humboldt University of Berlin in 1950, under supervision of Helmut Hasse. In 1966 he became professor of mathematics at the University of Cologne, a position he held until 1985.

Among his most important results is an alternative solution to the class number 1 problem, building on the original Stark–Heegner theorem.

Books by Meyer

References

External links

1919 births
2011 deaths
20th-century German mathematicians
21st-century German mathematicians
Humboldt University of Berlin alumni
Academic staff of the University of Cologne